Alicia Svigals (born January 8, 1963) is an American violinist and composer. A co-founder of the Grammy-winning band The Klezmatics, she is considered by many to be the world's foremost living klezmer fiddler.

Early life
Alicia Svigals, violinist, composer and vocalist, was born on January 8, 1963 in The Bronx, New York City  and studied ethnomusicology at  Brown University.

Career
During the 1980s and 1990s, she studied with older klezmer violinist Leon Schwartz with the intent of reviving the style and technique of the klezmer violin tradition which had largely disappeared, and of which few recorded examples remain.  Although classically trained since childhood, she also travelled around Europe and Israel in her youth and tried to learn local styles.  Of her playing style, she said that it is "a combination of old fiddle style, clarinet technique, and this sort of Greek-Turkish timbre [... it's] half reconstructed-half invented."

She has taught klezmer to hundreds of students around the world over the past two decades, including violinists Steven Greenman and Itzhak Perlman.

Svigals was one of the founders in 1986 of the band the Klezmatics, and co-led the ensemble until 2001.  With them, she appeared on A Prairie Home Companion, Rosie O'Donnell's Kids are Punny, Good Morning America, MTV News, Nickelodeon, and NPR's New Sound and Weekend Edition. As a composer for the group, she provided music for the play A Dybbuk by Tony Kushner, and collaborations with poet Allen Ginsberg and Israeli singer Chava Alberstein.   They also performed with Itzhak Perlman on PBS' Emmy-winning Great Performances documentary In the Fiddler's House and on the Late Show with David Letterman, and appeared together in concert at Radio City Music Hall, Tanglewood, and Wolf Trap.

Svigals has been commissioned to compose for the Kronos Quartet, as well as recording for the television series The L Word.  She was awarded the Foundation for Jewish Culture's 2013 New Jewish Culture Network commission for her original score to the 1918 silent Pola Negri film The Yellow Ticket. In 2014 she was an NEA MacDowell Fellow in composition, and a fellow at LABA: A Laboratory for Jewish Culture.

She is featured on recordings by such Hasidic artists such as Avraham Fried and Lipa Schmeltzer.  She has collaborated with 'second generation' author Thane Rosenbaum, whose novel The Golems of Gotham is based in part on Svigals.  She is featured on Herb Alpert’s 2008 recording of the Yiddish theater song "Belz", arranged by Marvin Hamlisch.  Other recording, performing and composing collaborators include Diane Birch, Gary Lucas, Robert Plant and Jimmy Page, John Cale, Ben Folds, John Zorn, Debbie Friedman.

Personal life
Svigals also has a wedding and bat/bar mitzvah band that plays every genre of music, based in New York and Boston.  She is a lesbian.

Notes

References

 Adventures in Yiddishland: Postvernacular Language and Culture, Jeffery Shandler, p. 143, 232-233
 And We're All Brothers: Singing in Yiddish in Contemporary North America, Abigail Wood
 American Klezmer: Its Roots and Offshoots, Mark Slobin p. 140-142, 145, 156, 167, 174-5, 187-9, 191, 207, 218, 234
 Dictionnaire des Musiques: (Les Dictionnaires d'Universalis)
 Ethnic American Literature: Comparing Chicano, Jewish, and African American Writing, Dean J. Franco, p. 146, 212, 219
 Fiddler on the Move, Mark Slobin p. 2, 47-51, 62, 74-75, 97-99, 107, 110, 118-28, 142, 145, 153
 Jews and Jazz: Improvising Ethnicity,  Charles B Hersch
 Jews and American Popular Culture: Music, theater, popular art, and literature,  Paul Buhle
 Klezmer America: Jewishness, Ethnicity, Modernity, Jonathan Freedman
 Klezmer!: Jewish Music from Old World to Our World, Henry Sapoznik
 North American Fiddle Music: A Research and Information Guide, Drew Beisswenger p. 255, 880-889
 Shpil: The Art of Playing Klezmer, Yale Strom p. 26, 111, 150-152
 The Book of Klezmer: The History, the Music, the Folklore, Yale Strom, p. 193, 220-229, 373-374
 The Contemporary Violinist: Preface by Turtle Island String Quartet, Julie Lyonn Lieberman
 The Fiddle Handbook, Chris Haigh
 "The Klez Dispenser." In Something to Say: Thoughts on Art and Politics in America. Klin, Richard and Lily Prince (photos). Leapfrog Press, 2011.
 The Essential Klezmer, Seth Rogovoy, p. 7, 15, 38, 49, 75–6, 115, 117–123, 166, 191–3, 218, 228–9, 242, 247, 264–6, 280
 The New Jewish Leaders, Jack Wertheimer, p. 196
 Von der Khupe zum Klezkamp, Susan Bauer
 Which Side Are You On?: An Inside History of the Folk Music Revival in America, Dick Weissman, p. 227
 Why Is America Different?: American Jewry on its 350th Anniversary, Steven T. Katz
 World Music: Latin & North America, Caribbean, India, Asia and Pacific, Simon Broughton
 Women and music in America since 1900: an encyclopedia, Volume 2, Kristine Helen Burns
 'You Should See Yourself': Jewish Identity in Postmodern American Culture, Vincent Brook

External links
AliciaSvigals.com
KlezmerShack review of Alicia Svigals' "Fidl" CD

1963 births
Jewish American musicians
Klezmer musicians
American lesbian musicians
LGBT Jews
LGBT people from New York (state)
People from the Bronx
Living people
The Klezmatics members
Jewish women musicians
20th-century American LGBT people
21st-century American LGBT people